The 2018–19 Sydney FC W-League season was the club's eleventh season in the W-League, the premier competition for women's football in Australia. This season the team played their home games at Seymour Shaw Park, Jubilee Oval, Leichhardt Oval and WIN Stadium. The club is managed by Ante Juric.

Players

Squad information
Last updated 24 October 2018

Transfers in

Transfers out

Managerial staff

W-League

League table

Fixtures

Finals Series

Results summary

Results by round

References

External links 
 Official Website

Sydney FC (A-League Women) seasons